Friederike is a feminine given name which may refer to:

People 
Friederike Sophie Wilhelmine of Prussia, Margravine of Brandenburg-Bayreuth (1709–1758), Prussian princess and older sister of Frederick the Great
Princess Friederike Luise of Prussia (1714–1784), Margravine of Brandenburg-Ansbach
Margravine Friederike of Brandenburg-Schwedt (1736–1798), Duchess of Württemberg
Princess Friederike of Hesse-Darmstadt (1752–1782), Duchess of Mecklenburg-Strelitz
Countess Friederike of Schlieben (1757–1827), Duchess of Schleswig-Holstein-Sonderburg-Beck
Princess Friederike of Schleswig-Holstein-Sonderburg-Beck (1780–1862), daughter of Friedrich Karl Ludwig, Duke of Schleswig-Holstein-Sonderburg-Beck
Princess Friederike of Schleswig-Holstein-Sonderburg-Glücksburg (1811–1902), daughter of Duke Friedrich Wilhelm of Schleswig-Holstein-Sonderburg-Glücksburg
Friederike Brun (1765–1835), Danish author and salonist
Friederike Caroline Neuber (1697–1760), German actor and theatre director
Friederike Grün (1836–1917), German operatic soprano
Friederike Kempner (1836–1904), Polish-German Jewish poet
Friederike Koderitsch (1894–1978), Dutch Olympic fencer
Friederike Krüger (1789–1848), a woman who impersonated a man to join the Prussian army
Friederike Lienig (1790–1855), Latvian entomologist
Friederike Löwy (1910–1994), Austrian Olympic swimmer
Friederike Mayröcker (1924–2021), Austrian poet
Friederike Nadig (1897–1970), German politician
Friederike Roth (born 1948), German writer

Fictional characters 
 Friederike Losigkeit, from the anime/manga Strike Witches
 Friederike Porsche, from the anime/manga Strike Witches
 Friederike, from the manga Ludwig Kakumei

See also 
Princess Frederica (disambiguation), including other variant spellings

Feminine given names
German feminine given names